Melica transsilvanica is a species of grass found in Europe and temperate Asia, including Caucasus and China.

Description
The species is perennial and caespitose with elongated rhizomes. They also have scaberulous surface and are rough on both sides.

Fertile spikelets are comprised out of 1 fertile floret which is diminished at the apex.

It margins are ciliated while it apex is obtuse. Sterile florets are barren, clumped, cuneate, and grow 2–3 in number. Both the lower and upper glumes are oblong, keelless, membranous, have erosed apexes, and are 5-veined. Palea is 2-veined with flowers being fleshy, oblong and truncate. They also have 2 lodicules, and grow together with their 3 anthers which have fruits that are caryopsis and have an additional pericarp with linear hilum.

Distribution
In central Asia the species is found in Kazakhstan, Kyrgyzstan, Tajikistan, Turkmenistan, Uzbekistan and northern part of Iran. It is also found in Xinjiang, China and Asian part of Russia. In Europe, it is present in such countries as Czech Republic, Germany, Austria, Albania, Bulgaria, Greece, Hungary, Italy, Poland, Romania, and Switzerland. It subspecies Melica transsilvanica transsilvanica is found only in Moldova and Ukraine.

Ecology
The species is scattered throughout forested areas where it margins prefer closed vegetation. It grows on limestone, sandstone, basalt, granite, gypsum, porphyry, and talus.

Habitat

References

External links
Images
More images
Description

Further reading

transsilvanica
Flora of Asia
Flora of Europe